The Men's Freestyle 86  kg competition of the Wrestling events at the 2019 Pan American Games in Lima was held on August 10 at the Miguel Grau Coliseum.

Results
All times are local (UTC−5)
Legend
F — Won by fall

Final

Repechage

References

External links
Competition Sheet

Wrestling at the 2019 Pan American Games